The Eurasian griffon vulture (Gyps fulvus) is a large Old World vulture in the bird of prey family Accipitridae. It may also be known as the Griffon vulture, though it may be used for the genus as a whole. It is not to be confused with the Rüppell's griffon vulture (Gyps rueppellii) and  Himalayan griffon vulture (Gyps himalayensis). It is closely related to the white-backed vulture (Gyps africanus).

Description 
In the nominate race the males weigh  and females typically weigh , while in the Indian subspecies (G. f. fulvescens), the vultures average . Hatched naked, it is a typical Old World vulture in appearance, with a very white head, very broad wings and short tail feathers. It has a white neck ruff and yellow bill. The buff body and wing coverts contrast with the dark flight feathers.

Distribution and habitat

In Italy, the species managed to survive only in the island of Sardinia, but a few attempts at reintroducing the griffon in the peninsula have been recently made, too. As a result, several specimens have been spotted again in August 2006 on the Gran Sasso massif (central Italy). Populations in Italy are thought to be undergoing a vigorous increase, thanks to reintroduction schemes in neighbouring countries taking effect, and a ban on hunting the species.

In Croatia, a colony of griffon vultures can be found near the town of Beli on the island of Cres. Therefore, contact with people is common. The population makes frequent incursions in the Slovenian territory, especially in the mountain Stol above Kobarid. The bird is protected in an area called Kuntrep on the Croatian island of Krk
In Ireland, the first record of a griffon vulture occurred in 1843 in Cork. More recently, in 2000 a vulture took up residence on the Channel Island of Guernsey. 

In Cyprus, there is an unsustainable colony of fewer than 30 birds (2016) at Episkopi, in the south of the island.

In Israel and the occupied territories, colonies of griffon vultures can be found in northern Israel and in the Golan Heights, where a large colony breeds in the Carmel Mountains, the Negev desert and especially at Gamla, where reintroduction projects are being carried out at breeding centres in the Carmel and Negev.

In Greece, there are nearly 1000 birds. The majority of griffon vulture population in Greece resides in Crete, which hosts the largest insular population of the species in the world. On Crete they can be found in most mountainous areas, sometimes in groups of up to 20.

Griffon vultures have been reintroduced successfully into the Massif Central in France; about 500 are now found there. Griffon vultures are regularly spotted over the Millau bridge, and since 2015 also in the Cantal Mountains.
 In Belgium and the Netherlands, around 100 birds were present in the summer of 2007. These were vagrants from the Pyrenees population (see below).
 In Germany, the species died out in the mid-18th century. Some 200 vagrant birds, probably from the Pyrenees, were sighted in 2006, and several dozen of the vagrants sighted in Belgium the following year crossed into Germany in search for food. There are plans to reintroduce the species in the Alps. In September 2008, pieces of a griffon vulture bone, about 35,000 years old, were excavated from Hohle Fels cave in southern Germany, which are believed to form a flute.
In Serbia, there are around 60–65 pairs of griffon vultures in the western parts of the country, around Zlatar mountain and also 35 birds in the canyon of the Trešnjica river. They are under legal protection from hunting.

In Austria, there is a remnant population around Salzburg Zoo, and vagrants from the Balkans are often seen.
In Spain and France, in 2008, there were 25,000 birds, from a low of a few thousand around 1980. Spain has the biggest colony of Griffon vultures in all Europe. It is located at Hoces del Río Duratón Natural Park (Province of Segovia).
In Portugal a few hundred pairs of griffons nest, but their distribution is strongly asymmetric. The main areas of reproduction are located in the northeast (Douro International), which is home to more than half of the Portuguese population. Though permanently resident in the interior of the country, the griffon vulture often ventures west when the breeding season is over and can occasionally reach the Tagus Estuary and Cape St. Vincent.
The Pyrenees population has apparently been affected by an EC ruling that due to danger of BSE transmission, no carcasses must be left on the fields for the time being. This has critically lowered food availability, and consequently, carrying capacity. Although the griffon vulture does not normally attack larger living prey, there are reports of Spanish griffon vultures killing weak, young or unhealthy living animals as they do not find enough carrion to eat. In May 2013, a 52-year-old woman who was hiking in the Pyrenees and had fallen off a cliff to her death was eaten by griffon vultures before rescue workers were able to recover her body, leaving only her clothes and a few of her bones. Due to her being the first human to be documented being eaten by griffon vultures, the story brought worldwide attention to the griffon vulture problems in Southern Europe.
In Armenia there are 46-54 pairs according to last estimation of population; the trend demonstrates slight increasing.
In Russia, nests on the northern slopes of the Greater Caucasus.

Behaviour and ecology 

Like other vultures, it is a scavenger, feeding mostly from carcasses of dead animals which it finds by soaring over open areas, often moving in flocks. It establishes nesting colonies in cliffs that are undisturbed by humans while coverage of open areas and availability of dead animals within dozens of kilometres of these cliffs is high. It grunts and hisses at roosts or when feeding on carrion.

The maximum recorded lifespan of the griffon vulture is 41.4 years for an individual in captivity.

It breeds on crags in mountains in southern Europe, north Africa, and Asia, laying one egg. Griffon vultures may form loose colonies. The population is mostly resident. Juveniles and immature individuals may migrate far or embark on long-distance movements. Density Dependence in this colonial species has been shown to affect annual reproductive success with eyries in protected location (caves, potholes and sheltered ledges) producing more fledglings, and used preferentially, than low-quality eyries (exposed ledges and open crevices), which were only used when the number of breeding individuals increased.

Physiology 
Griffon vultures have been used as model organisms for the study of soaring and thermoregulation. The energy costs of level flight tend to be high, prompting alternatives to flapping in larger birds. Vultures in particular utilize more efficient flying methods such as soaring. Compared to other birds, which elevate their metabolic rate to upwards of 16 times their basal metabolic rate in flight, soaring griffon vultures expend about 1.43 times their basal metabolic rate in flight. Griffon vultures are also efficient flyers in their ability to return to a resting heart rate after flight within ten minutes.

As large scavengers, griffon vultures have not been observed to seek shelter for thermoregulation. Vultures use their bald heads as a means to thermoregulate in both extreme cold and hot temperatures. Changes in posture can increase bare skin exposure from 7% to 32%. This change allows for the more than doubling of convective heat loss in still air. Griffon vultures have also been found to tolerate increased body temperatures as a response to high ambient temperatures. By allowing their internal body temperature to change independently of their metabolic rate, griffon vultures minimize their loss of water and energy in thermoregulating. One study in particular (Bahat 1995) found that these adaptations have allowed the Griffon vulture to have one of the widest thermal neutral zones of any bird.

Intraspecific competition
In respect to varying age ranges, the griffon vultures evidently show no difference in feeding rates. Inevitably, as resource availability increases, feeding rates tend to follow the same pattern. Upon studying the reintroduction of this species and its impact on the intraspecific competition, old adults are more inclined to display aggressive behavior and signs of dominance in comparison to the other age ranges. In terms of comparing the male and female sexes, there are no observed differences in competitive behaviors. Lastly, the reintroduced individuals of the species and the wild-bred do not differ in dominance or feeding rate despite the differences in upbringing.

Threats 
The main cause of the rapid decline in the griffon vulture population is the consumption of poisoned baits set out by people. Wildlife conservation efforts have attempted to increase awareness of the lethal consequences of using illegally poisoned baits through education about the issue.

References

External links

 Vulture Territory Facts and Characteristics: Eurasian Griffon
 Uvac Special Nature Reserve, Serbia (in Serbian)
 Ageing and sexing (PDF; 5.6 MB) by Javier Blasco-Zumeta & Gerd-Michael Heinze 
 Flicker Handguide
 Grifon Birds of Prey Conservation Centre in Crnika, Croatia
 Mas de Bunyol Vulture observatory in Spain
 Yatsey the Griffon vulture
 
 
 
 
 
 A Bulgarian vulture's odyssey into Yemeni war zone

griffon vulture
griffon vulture
Birds of North Africa
Birds of prey of Eurasia
griffon vulture
griffon vulture
National symbols of Albania
National symbols of Afghanistan
National symbols of Bosnia and Herzegovina
National symbols of Bulgaria
National symbols of Croatia
National symbols of Iran
National symbols of Kosovo
National symbols of Montenegro
National symbols of North Macedonia
National symbols of Serbia
National symbols of Tajikistan
National symbols of Turkey
National symbols of Yugoslavia